is a Japanese actor who is a member of the theatre company Gekidan Exile.

Born in Edogawa, Tokyo, he is represented by LDH Japan.

Biography
In 2009, he passed the "First Gekidan Exile Audition," and began his acting career. He has appeared in a number of theatre productions, feature films and television series.

Appearances

Stage
Gekidan Exile Hanagumi Festival Performance Yubae 8-gō (Nov 2009) – as Nakajima
Gekidan Exile Hanagumi 2nd performance Rokuwarutō (Apr 2010) – as Shikichi Kimura
Gekidan Exile Hanagumi 3rd performance Kill The Black (Jun 2010) – as Ponce/Kunio
Gekidan Exile Hanagumi×Kazegumi joint performance Rokudenashi Blues (Dec 2010) – as Kotobu Nakada
'12' –12-Ri no Ikareru Otoko yori– (Feb 2011)
Konton Club –image4– (Apr 2011)
Hōnangumi project performance "Fukuru no Nezumi" extra edition Michi (Jul 2011)
Kohei Tsuka Memorial Performance Shin Bakumatsu Junjō-den (Sep–Oct 2011)
Sanada Ten Braves –Boku-ra ga Mamoritakatta mono– (Dec 2011)
Taichi Saotome special performance Goemon –Kokō no Senshi– (Mar–May 2012)
Hōnangumi×Gekidan Exile Attack No.1 (Aug–Sep 2012)
Satomi Hakkenden (Nov 2012)
Bio Hazard Cafe de Chōshoku o (Feb 2013)
Gekidan Exile performance Sadako -Tanjō Hiwa- (May 2013)
Gekidan Exile performance Attack No.1 (Aug–Sep 2013) – as Second Lieutenant Tetsuo Otaki
Psychometer Eiji –Tokei Shikake no Ringo– (Feb–Mar 2014) – Starring; as Eiji Asuma
Gekidan Exile Attack No.1 spin-off read aloud Mayuge Ichizoku no Inbō (Apr 2014)
Gekidan Exile performance The Mensetsu (Jul 2014)
Gekidan Exile performance Soreike Kogekijō!! (Oct 2014)
Aoyama Mainland presents gmk project first show Shin Bakumatsu Junjō-den (Jan 2015)
Gekidan Exile performance Tomorrow Never Dies –Yattekonai Ashita wanai– (Feb–Mar 2015)
WataRoom production performance Otoko ga Naku Riyū, Oshiemasu '4649''' (May 2015)
Hōnangumi Planned Performance Attack No.1 (Aug 2015)Vivid Contact -re:born- (Jan 2016)
Mitsukoshi Theater Presents Reading Stage Aitakute (Sep 2017)
Hōnangumi Planned Performance Iga no Hanayome Sono Ni Onihasoto-hen (Jan–Feb 2018)Akatsuki no Tei –Jinshin no Ran-hen– (Jun–Jul 2018) – Starring

TV dramas
Premium Saturday Yume no Mitsuke-kata Oshietaru! 2 (13 Mar 2010, CX)Rokudenashi Blues (Jul–Sep 2011, NTV) – as Katsutsugu YamashitaKekkon Dōsōkai –Seaside Love– (Jul–Aug 2012, Fuji TV Two) – as Kota Shigeki
Saturday Night at the Mysteries Yame Ken no Onna 3 (21 Jul 2012, ABC) – as DetectiveSugarless (Oct–Dec 2012, NTV) – as Nobumitsu Ogaki/Ogre
Suiyō Mystery 9 Tokumei Obasan Kenji! Ayano Hanamura no Jiken File (26 Dec 2012, TX) – as Koji KanaiGTO Kanketsu-hen –Saraba Onizuka! Sotsugyō Special (2 Apr 2013, CX)Hanasaku ashita (Jan–Feb 2014, NHK BS Premium) – as Sho KomiyamaTemmis no Kyūkei Episode 2 (17 May 2015, Wowow)High & Low: The Story of S.W.O.R.D. (Oct–Dec 2015, NTV) – as Washi KatoHigh & Low: Season2 (Apr–Jun 2016)Ultraman Geed (Jul–Dec 2017, TX) – as Leito IgaguriKoshiji Fubuki Monogatari (Jan 2018 –, TV Asahi) – as Shuji Sakuma

Webcast dramasOnna Rule Shiawase ni naru tame no 50 no Okite Episode 12 (23 Apr 2013, NotTV)Renai wa Hitsuzendearu –Drama de Wakaru! Shin Kankaku Renai Hōsoku– Episode 8 (12 Feb 2014, dVideo-BeeTV)

FilmsGebaruto (Nov 2013) – Starring; as Kuniko AnnoRoad To High & Low (May 2016) – as Washi KatoHigh & Low: The Movie (Jul 2016)High & Low: The Movie 2/End Of Sky (Aug 2017)Ultraman Geed the Movie (Mar 2018) – as Leito IgaguriThe Dignified Death of Shizuo Yamanaka (2020)Shikkokuten (2022)

Music videos
Sandaime J Soul Brothers "Fighters" (2011)

Radio dramas
Saturday Drama House "Binanshi Gekijō" Story Dai Jūku Dan Story Dancing in the Nursery'' (Oct 2016, JNF) – as Suzue Haraguchi, Jin Ebisawa

References

External links
 – LDH 
 – Gekidan Exile 
 

Male actors from Tokyo
1985 births
Living people
LDH (company) artists